Datuk Ng Joo Ngan (born 21 August 1947, Kuala Lumpur, Malaysia) is considered one of the most successful cyclists in Malaysia history, having won the most competitions and the Asian Games.

He started cycling at the age of 15. It all started when he accepted a challenge to race with his elder brother's friend. He lost the race but after a week of training, he won the next race. From that day onwards, he train cycling daily and within a year, he was a national cyclist representing Malaysia.

Personal achievements
1966 Represented Malaysia for ASIA Games, Bangkok
Overall 4th placing for TEAM time trial

1967 Represented Malaysia for SEAP Games, Kuala Lumpur
Bronze medal for 4 km Team pursuit
Silver medal for 100 km Team time trial
Bronze medal for 200 km road race

1968 National Champion for 40 km Individual time trial 
National Champion for 25 km Criterium race

1970 National Champion for Track & Road race in Seremban
Represented Malaysia for Tour of Jawa
Overall Team & Individual Champion
Represented Malaysia for ASIA Games, Bangkok
GOLD medal for 200 km road race (Record Holder)
Silver medal for 200 km Team road race

1971 National Champion for Individual road race of Tour of Malaysia
 8 days race totalling 1,020 km
 Awarded "Sportsman of the Year 1970"

1973 Represented Malaysia for SEAP Games, Singapore
Silver medal for 100 km Team road race
Bronze medal for 100 km Team time trial

1974 National Champion for 200 km road race.

In conjunction with the Federal Territory Day on 1 February 2010, Ng Joo Ngan was conferred the Panglima Mahkota Wilayah (P.M.W) which carries the title "Datuk". The ceremony was carried out at the Istana Negara, Kuala Lumpur.

References

External links
Findarticles.com
Bikex.vox.com
Fairozizni.blogspot.com
Olympic.org.my
Nst.com.my

1947 births
Living people
Malaysian male cyclists
Malaysian people of Chinese descent
Asian Games medalists in cycling
Cyclists at the 1966 Asian Games
Cyclists at the 1970 Asian Games
Medalists at the 1970 Asian Games
Asian Games gold medalists for Malaysia
Asian Games silver medalists for Malaysia